Meeting the Tenors is an album by guitarist Doug Raney recorded in 1983 and released on the Dutch label, Criss Cross Jazz.

Track listing 
 "Up in Quincy's Room" (Gigi Gryce) – 7:50
 "Blues for Bart" (Ferdinand Povel) – 8:58
 "Waltz Number One" (Horace Parlan) – 6:56
 "Arrival" (Parlan) – 7:37
 "Lover Man" (Jimmy Davis, Ram Ramirez, Jimmy Sherman) – 7:29
 "The Night Has a Thousand Eyes" (Vincent Youmans, Irving Caesar) – 9:20

Personnel 
Doug Raney – guitar
Ferdinand Povel – tenor saxophone
Bernt Rosengren – tenor saxophone, flute
Horace Parlan – piano
Jesper Lundgaard – bass
Ole Jacob Hansen – drums

References 

Doug Raney albums
1984 albums
Criss Cross Jazz albums